The 2009 European Junior Swimming Championships were held from 8–12 July 2009 in Prague, Czech Republic. The age groups for this event are girls born in 1993 or 1994 and boys born in 1991 and 1992. The tournament is organized by LEN, the European Swimming League, and was held in a 50 m pool.

Medal table

Medal summary

Boy's events

Girl's events

External links 
 
 

J
S
European Junior Swimming Championships
S
Sports competitions in Prague
Swimming in the Czech Republic
July 2009 sports events in Europe
2000s in Prague
Swimming